Norway is divided into 11 administrative regions, called counties (fylker in Norwegian, singular: fylke), and 356 municipalities (kommuner/-ar, singular: kommune – cf. communes). The capital city Oslo is considered both a county and a municipality.
 
Municipalities are the atomic unit of local government in Norway and are responsible for primary education (until 10th grade), outpatient health services, senior citizen services, unemployment and other social services, zoning, economic development, and municipal roads.  Law enforcement and church services are provided at a national level in Norway.
 
Municipalities are undergoing continuous consolidation.  In 1930, there were 747 municipalities in Norway. As of 2020 there are 356 municipalities, a reduction from 422. See the list of former municipalities of Norway for further detail about municipal mergers.
 
The consolidation effort is complicated by a number of factors.  Since block grants are made by the national government to the municipalities based on an assessment of need, there is little incentive for the municipalities to lose local autonomy.  The national policy is that municipalities should only merge voluntarily, and studies are underway to identify potential gains.

Administration 
Each municipality has its own governmental leaders: the mayor (ordfører) and the municipal council (kommunestyre). The mayor is the executive leader. The municipal council is the deliberative and legislative body of the municipality and it is the highest governing body in the municipality.  The members of the municipal council are elected for a 4-year term.  A subdivision of the full council is the executive council (formannskap), composed of 5 members.

Municipalities

See also 
 List of the most populated municipalities in the Nordic countries

References

External links
Ministry of Local Government and Regional Development
 

 

 
Subdivisions of Norway
Municipalities
Norway 2
Municipalities, Norway
Municipalities
Norway
se:Gielddat Norggas